Marulevo is a village in Blagoevgrad Municipality, in Blagoevgrad Province, Bulgaria. It is situated in the foothills of Rila mountain 8 kilometers east of Blagoevgrad. The village is sparsely populated and composed of several isolated and almost abandoned neighborhoods. Once a vivid village in 1860 people built a church and founded an elementary school, later elevated to a primary school. In 1973 the school was closed due to the decreased number of students.

References

Villages in Blagoevgrad Province